Meja is a small settlement near Mavčiče in the Municipality of Kranj in the Upper Carniola region of Slovenia.

Name
The name Meja means 'border'. The name refers to the location of the village along the road from Jeprca to Kranj, which largely corresponded to the western border of the Dominion of Škofja Loka from 973 to 1803.

References

External links
Meja on Geopedia

Populated places in the City Municipality of Kranj